The Devahastin or Thephasadin family is a Thai family of royal descent, tracing its origins from Prince Thepharirak, a nephew of King Rama I. Its best known member was Sanan Devahastin na Ayudhya, better known by his noble title Chaophraya Thammasakmontri, a senior government official of the 1920s–1930s.

History
The family traces descent from Phraya Ratchaphakdi (Mom Rajawongse Chang), whom sources describe as either a grandson or a son of Prince Thepharirak, himself a nephew of King Rama I.

The family name was granted by King Vajiravudh (Rama VI) to Phraya Phaisansinlapasat (Sanan Devahastin na Ayudhya, later to become Chaophraya Thammasakmontri) in 1913 when he decreed the use of surnames. The romanized spelling Devahastin, which does not reflect the Thai pronunciation, is based on the Sanskrit root words deva and hastin, which roughly mean 'god' and 'elephant' (a reference to the name Chang, which also means 'elephant'). The name is suffixed with na Ayudhya, indicating royal descent.

People
Notable members of the family include:
 Chaophraya Thammasakmontri (Sanan Devahastin na Ayudhya, 1877–1943), senior government official, grandson of Chang
 Phraya Thephatsadin (Phat Devahastin na Ayudhya, 1878–1951), military general, nephew of Sanan
  (Santhat Devahastin na Ayudhya, 1880/1881–1948), first Commissioner of Chulalongkorn University, brother of Sanan
  (1904–1985), government minister
  (1905–1976), government minister
   Devahastin na Ayudhya (1915–2007), architect and city planner, daughter of Sanan
  (1917–1997), military general and government minister
  (born 1950), military general, political strategist for Palang Pracharath Party, Secretary-General of the National Olympic Committee of Thailand; son of Yos
  (born 1984), actor, grandson of Yos and nephew of Wit

She was driving underage without a licence, and the case sparked a huge amount of online public outrage. The case resurfaced in 2019, when it was revealed that the victims' families had not yet received their court-ordered financial compensation, prompting the Devahastin family to hold a press conference where, among other things, it pointed out that the clan comprised over 200 individual families and should not be blamed for the actions of one individual.

Notes

References

 
Families descended from the Chakri dynasty